The Fiddler of Florence is a 1926 German silent comedy film directed by Paul Czinner and starring Elisabeth Bergner, Conrad Veidt, and Nora Gregor. The film was shot at the EFA Studios in Berlin and on location around Lake Lugano in Italy. It premiered at the Gloria-Palast in Berlin. It reunited Bergner and Veidt who had starred together in the successful Husbands or Lovers, also directed by Czinner.

Synopsis
A girl escapes from her strict Swiss school and heads for Florence.

Cast

References

Bibliography

External links

1926 films
1926 comedy films
German comedy films
Films of the Weimar Republic
German silent feature films
Films directed by Paul Czinner
Films with screenplays by Paul Czinner
Films produced by Erich Pommer
Films set in Florence
Films set in Switzerland
Films shot in Florence
Films set in boarding schools
Cross-dressing in film
UFA GmbH films
German black-and-white films
Silent comedy films
Films shot at Halensee Studios
1920s German films
1920s German-language films